Lepidus is a genus of extinct theropod from the Upper Triassic of the United States. It lived in the Otis Chalk localities of the Dockum Group in Texas, around 223 million years ago.

Discovery
 
It was first described in 2015 by Nesbitt & Ezcurra, who decided it warranted a new taxon, which they named Lepidus praecisio. The generic name is Latin for "fascinating", and the specific name is Latin for "fragment", or "scrap". The holotype material includes a tibia, astragalus, and fibula, and other referred material includes a femur and maxilla. The holotypic material is well preserved and shows signs of muscle scars. The astragalus and calcaneum are clearly fused into one bone, with no visible suture. The tibia resembles that of neotheropods, in overall morphology. The shape of the tibia resembles the same in Camposaurus, Coelophysis, Tawa, Eodromaeus, and Herrerasaurus.

Lepidus was one of eighteen dinosaur taxa from 2015 to be described in open access or free-to-read journals.

Classification
 
A phylogenetic analysis was conducted, including with and without referred material. The results are shown below:

See also
 Timeline of coelophysoid research

References

Late Triassic dinosaurs of North America
Coelophysoids
Fossil taxa described in 2015
Taxa named by Sterling Nesbitt
Paleontology in Texas